Songs for Survivors is the fifth solo studio album by British-American singer-songwriter Graham Nash, released in July 2002.

Track listing

Personnel 
 Graham Nash – lead vocals, acoustic guitar, harmonica
 Matt Rollings – keyboards
 Dan Dugmore – acoustic guitars, electric guitars, banjo, pedal steel guitar
 Steve Farris – acoustic guitars, electric guitars
 Dean Parks – acoustic guitars, electric guitars
 Viktor Krauss – acoustic bass, electric bass
 Russ Kunkel – drums, percussion
 Lenny Castro – percussion
 Sydney Forest – vocals
 David Crosby – vocals
 Nathaniel Kunkel – recording, mixing, mastering 
 Andrew Ackland – assistant engineer 
 Alan Mason – assistant engineer 
 Wes Seidman – assistant engineer 
 Doug Sax and Robert Hadley – stereo mastering at The Mastering Lab (Hollywood, California)
 Laura Grover – production coordinator 
 Edd Kolakowski – keyboard technician 
 John Gonzales – guitar technician 
 Danny De La Luz – drum technician and atmosphere

References

2002 albums
Artemis Records albums
Albums produced by Russ Kunkel
Albums produced by Graham Nash
Graham Nash albums